Piirissaare Airfield (ICAO: EEPR) was an airfield on the island of Piirissaar, Tartu County, Estonia.

The airfield was used during Soviet Estonia period, and in order to serve a small air service of five flights a week. In the beginning of 1990s, the airfield was closed.

References

External links
 Piirissaare Airfield at Forgotten Airfields

Defunct airports in Estonia
Buildings and structures in Tartu County
Tartu County